Geum , (Latinized Greek for "taste" referencing the roots of the plant) commonly called avens, is a genus of about 50 species of rhizomatous perennial herbaceous plants in the rose family and its subfamily Rosoideae, widespread across Europe, Asia, North and South America, Africa, and New Zealand. They are closely related to Potentilla and Fragaria. From a basal rosette of leaves, they produce flowers on wiry stalks, in shades of white, red, yellow, and orange, in midsummer. Geum species are evergreen except where winter temperatures drop below . The cultivars 'Lady Stratheden' (with yellow flowers), and 'Mrs J. Bradshaw' (with orange flowers) have gained the Royal Horticultural Society's Award of Garden Merit. 

Geum species are used as food by the larvae of some Lepidoptera species including the grizzled skipper.

Selected species

For a more detailed list see List of Geum species.

References

External links

 Jepson Manual Treatment, University of California
 Ontario Wildflowers: Avenses Group

 
Rosaceae genera
Taxa named by Carl Linnaeus